GIADS - German Improved Air Defence System - is the standard Air Command and Control System (ACC System / AC2 – System) of the German Air Force Tactical Command and Control Service (GAF TACCS).

Definition 
GIADS is the standard ACC System of the GAF TACCS. It is operated in the static Control and Reporting Centres (CRC Erndtebrück and CRC Schönewalde) and the deployable CRC (on Holzdorf Air Base) in order to provide Airspace Surveillance, to control Air Force Operations, and to meet the military commitment of the Bundeswehr.

History 
Up to the year 2000 the standard AC2 System of the GAF TACCS was ARKONA which had been taken over former the former East German Air Force. In the time to come it had to be replaced by the successor system GIADS. In July 2000 the first GIADS CRC in Schönewalde became operational. Since that time GIADS has been improve, further developed and introduced to the other German CRCs (including Deployable CRC). By the introduction of GIADS III in 2010/11, the probable final GAF AC2 System's generation might have been procured.

Prospect 
GIADS lll should be replaced in line with the joint NATO procurement programme by the successor AC2 product, the Air Command and Control System (ACCS).

Functionality
 Coincident / parallel RADAR data processing of up to 20 different civil/military sensors data sources
 Correlation with civil flight plan data 
 Processing of a Recognized Air Picture (RAP)
 Control of military aircraft and Surface to Air Missile (SAM) units
 Data Recording an Replay function 
 Processing of up to 12,000 plots; 3,000 system tracks and 1,000 flight plan
 ICAO Mode S capability

Advantages in comparison to ARKONA 
 Automatic selection of the most beneficial radar data source by Multi-Sensor-Tracking
 Decisive enhancement of the Fighter Control capability
 NATO Link 16 capability (interim / disposal solution)
 Enhanced support (e.g. emergence cases, air space violations, critical air vehicles)
 Data exchange with up to 24 external AC2 Systems 
 Improved IT-Security

In-Service Support Management 
The GAF Material Command, followed by the GAF Weapon Systems Command – WSC (de: Waffensystemkommando der Luftwaffe – WaSysKdoLw), have been in charge of the GIADS In-Service Support Management (ISSM). Today this WSC provides the obsolescence management, the hardware and software configuration control and the software related instructions to that GAF C3 SSC and EADS, in charge of GIADS software change and maintenance.

Sources 
 50 Years of GAF TACCS 1960 – 2010, L. Fölbach 2001, www.foelbach.de
 Mil. Glossary of studies, Federal office of foreign languages (de: Studienglossar, Bundessprachenamt) 50354, actual issue

External links 
 Luftwaffe official website 
Der TACCS on the GAF Homepage
 The German CRCs on the GAF Homepage

Air traffic control systems
Command and control
German Air Force
Post–Cold War military equipment of Germany
Information operations and warfare
Military technology
NATO